John Orson Oldfield (24 June 1781;20 October 1860) was an Irish Anglican priest.

Oldfield was born in Lismore, County Waterford and educated at Trinity College, Dublin. He was  appointed Archdeacon of Elphin in 1823  Oldfield resigned in 1845 for the Prebendal Stall of Ballintubber in Elphin Cathedral.

References 

Archdeacons of Elphin
Alumni of Trinity College Dublin
People from County Waterford
19th-century Irish Anglican priests
1860 deaths
1781 births